Lutsyshyn is a surname. Notable people with the surname include: 

Oksana Lutsyshyn (born 1964), Ukrainian-American recording artist, pianist, and professor
Roman Lutsyshyn (born 1994), Ukrainian track cyclist